In France, associated communes were created by the Commune Merger Act of July 16, 1971 (also called the Marcellin Act). It permits the formerly independent communes to maintain certain institutions, such as
 a delegate mayor, a registrar, a criminal investigation officer
 a mayor's office
 a community center 

On January 1, 2006, there were 730 communes associées in France. Most of those were created within four years after the Marcellin Act was passed.

External links
 Code officiel géographique 2006

Subdivisions of France